Hernan Dahl (born 3 May 2002, in Oslo) is a Norwegian YouTuber, actor and television personality.

Career 
Aged 11, he started to play the role of Axel in the NRK series Jenter ("Girls"), from 2013 until 2015 and again in the final episode of Series 10, premiered in 2017.

Dahl has a YouTube channel with over 122,000 subscribers, which won him the Gullsnutten award in the "YouTuber of the year" category, aged 14 in 2017. In 2019 he won the Gullsnutten for "Inspiration of the year". He also took part in the reality show Generation Z on TV 2 in 2018 and 2019, a documentary about upcoming celebrities.

In February 2020 he won the NRK reality show Maestro, in which celebrities get a chance to conduct the Norwegian Radio Orchestra. In December of that year, he finished third on the first series of Maskorama, the Norwegian version ofThe Masked Singer as "Vikingen".

Dahl is part of the Splay Norge YouTuber group, and in 2018 sung on charity Christmas single Nå er det jul with social media influencers Markus Sannes, Isabelle Eriksen, Agnete Husebye and Stina Talling.

In 2021, he took part in the game show Fangene på fortet, the Norwegian version of Fort Boyard.

Television appearances

References 

Norwegian YouTubers
2002 births
Living people